Aaron's Hill is a suburb of Godalming in Surrey, England. It is named after the hill it sits on and has a road named after it. Aaron's Hill is adjacent to another suburb, Ockford ridge and also to Ockford Wood, it is located in the western end of Godalming and slightly further west is the village of Eashing and the A3 trunk road. Aaron's Hill is elevated 76 metres above sea level and is in the Waverley district.

Aaron's Hill has a population of 338.

Geography

Aaron's Hill, as the name suggests, is on a hill. From the main road, Eashing Lane, there is a single road appropriately named Aaron's hill which leads to the suburb and all its respective housing. From the road there are many dead end streets, loops, and cul-de-sacs where most of the housing is located. Back on the main road there's some of the Amenities that Aaron's Hill has to offer. Aaron's Hill has a variety of walking trails in its vicinity.

History
The housing was built in pretty recent years, with nothing existing before the 1930s; this explains the modern street design with the dead end streets and loops.

Amenities
Aaron's hill consists of various shops and amenities. On the main street there's the local skatepark as well as a stonework and landscaping facility and a primary school. Further south there's a church and a cemetery although that's officially part of Ockford Ridge. In the new streets and housing estates there's a lot of mixed use development with amenities such as a Real Estate vendor, Beaty supply store and a sportsware store.

Transportation
Aaron's Hill is served by two local bus routes, the 71 and the 72. The 71 runs along Eashing lane only stopping once within the community whilst the 72 runs along some of the smaller streets and serves the local area more. These also run towards Godalming Railway Station which runs trains to Guildford, Woking, London, Haslemere and Portsmouth.

Development
New housing is for sale within Aaron's Hill and the area nearby.

References

Populated places in Surrey
Hills of Surrey
Godalming